Antony Alda (born Antonio Joseph D'Abruzzo; December 9, 1956 – July 3, 2009), sometimes called Tony, was an American actor who grew up in a popular acting family. The son of Robert Alda, he was born in France.  His early studies were in Rome and he finished at The Juilliard School in New York City. A prolific actor, he appeared on stage, in film, and on television. His career culminated in writing, directing, and performing in Role of a Lifetime.

Early life
Alda was born Antonio Joseph D'Abruzzo in St. Julien, France, into what would later be called an acting dynasty. His father was well known in the United States both in film and on Broadway, where he earned a Tony. Alda's mother, Flora Marino, was an Italian actress. His half-brother was Alan Alda.

About growing up within the dynasty, Antony once explained, "The theater has always been a comfortable place for me. I spent all my summers on Broadway. Dad would be in one play and Alan would be in another. I used to hang out with the lighting guys." He found that being an Alda had its professional ups and downs. "People figure you know what you're doing because you grew up around acting. Other people think you got the part because of your name."

Antony Alda finished his high school studies at Notre Dame International in Rome, and completed his academic career studying musical composition at The Juilliard School in New York City. He was married twice, first in 1975 to Leslie Clark at Saint Thomas Episcopal Church in New York City at Fifth Avenue. Their reception was held at the old Biltmore Hotel. The marriage lasted until 1977. His sons were born during his marriage to actress Lori Carrell, to whom he was married from 1981 to 1992. During this time his mother commented, "Marriage was good for Tony. It changed him and made him more mature."

Career
Throughout his career, Alda played in seven films, including the Oscar-winning Melvin and Howard, Homeboy, Hot Child in the City, and two TV "shorts" including Bungle Abbey. He was cast in several television series and appeared in more than 200 episodes including two on Knots Landing as Rick Elliot. Alda later played Johnny Corelli during two years (1990–1991) on NBC's Days of Our Lives.

Like Johnny Corelli, Alda saw himself as something of a jokester. He said, "I always played practical jokes on people." One prank involved his donning a wig and passing himself off as one of his mother's church friends to a visiting aunt.

Role of a Lifetime
His most notable accomplishment is the film Role of a Lifetime released in 2001. Alda wrote, directed, and acted in the film, which is about a formerly successful actor, Bobby. Bobby seems to be egotistical at first, but is soon rendered a sympathetic persona by the starring actor, Scott Bakula. Bobby has lost his wife in the Hollywood rat race and is on his way to becoming a "has-been."  He has an accident that results in a disappearance long enough for Hollywood to assume he is dead and to begin to cast a movie based on his life. Bobby takes on a different identity, that of Texan Buck Steele, in order to audition for and, eventually, play himself in the movie. In the persona of Buck Steele, Bobby interacts with his ex-wife, his best friend and a mysterious old Hispanic gentleman. These experiences, while disturbing, enable Bobby to re-examine many aspects of his life. (Alda both credited and quoted Socrates in the film; he inconspicuously placed Socrates' quote "An unexamined life is not worth living" in several scenes.)

Death
Alda died in Los Angeles on July 3, 2009, aged 52.

Filmography

Film

Television

As writer

As director

References

External links

1956 births
2009 deaths
Male actors from New York City
American male film actors
American male television actors
Deaths from cirrhosis
Juilliard School alumni
People from Manhattan
Male actors from Rome
French emigrants to the United States
Film directors from New York City
20th-century American male actors
Alcohol-related deaths in California